The Cognitive Abilities Test (CogAT) is a group-administered K–12 assessment published by Riverside Insights and intended to estimate students' learned reasoning and problem solving abilities through a battery of verbal, quantitative, and nonverbal test items. The test purports to assess students' acquired reasoning abilities while also predicting achievement scores when administered with the co-normed Iowa Tests. The test was originally published in 1954 as the Lorge-Thorndike Intelligence Test, after the psychologists who authored the first version of it, Irving Lorge and Robert L. Thorndike. The CogAT is one of several tests used in the United States to help teachers or other school staff make student placement decisions for gifted education programs, and is accepted for admission to Intertel, a high IQ society for those who score at or above the 99th percentile on a test of intelligence.

Forms 7 and 8 provide comparable scores and may be administered separately or together. Form 7 of the CogAT was designed to be appropriate for non-native English speakers.

Subtests
Each level of the CogAT includes test batteries with verbal, quantitative, or nonverbal items. Scores are reported separately for each category, and the three batteries may be administered separately.

CAT4
The CAT4 (Cognitive Abilities Test) is an alternative set of cognitive tests used by many schools in the UK, Ireland, and internationally. The tests were created by GL Education  to assess cognitive abilities and predict the future performance of a student. It consists of eight subtests: figure classification; figure matrices; verbal classification; verbal analogies; number analogies; number series; figure analysis; figure recognition - to evaluate a student's non-verbal, verbal, quantitative and spatial abilities. The CAT4 tests are levelled by age / year group  and are also used by many schools as part of their admissions process.

See also 
 Educational psychology
 School psychology
 Intelligence quotient
 Cognitive test

References

Further reading 

 Lohman, D. F., & Gambrell, J. (2012). Use of nonverbal measures in gifted identification. Journal of Psychoeducational Assessment, 30, 25-44

External links
 CogAT official website
 FAQ/Finding Information About Psychological Tests (American Psychological Association)

Cognitive tests
Intelligence tests